Henning Thorvaldssøn Astrup (21 February 1904 – 7 August 1983) was a Norwegian architect.

He was born in Kristiania (now Oslo), Norway to architect Thorvald Astrup and Alfhild Ebbesen. He was a nephew of Arctic explorer Eivind and merchant Sigurd Astrup.

Astrup graduated from the Norwegian Institute of Technology in 1927. From 1932  Henning  Astrup
worked in partnership with his father, Thorvald Astrup.  Among his designs were industrial buildings for Norsk Hydro at Herøya, Rjukan, Notodden, Glomfjord and Kykkelsrud. He also designed the lodging facilities  Skjennungstua and Kikutstua in Nordmarka and Skeikampen   in Gausdal.

References

1904 births
1983 deaths
Architects from Oslo
Norwegian Institute of Technology alumni